Jennifer Karen Lawson (born June 8, 1946) is an African American civil rights activist, and Senior vice president at PBS. A brief autobiographical statement from Lawson can be found at the Civil Rights Movement Archive.

Life
She was born in Fairfield, Alabama. She graduated from Columbia University.
She was a  SNCC field secretary.

References

External links
 https://www.crmvet.org/vet/lawson.htm

1946 births
Living people
African-American activists
Columbia University alumni
PBS people
People from Fairfield, Alabama
21st-century African-American people
20th-century African-American people